HD 152408, also known as WR 79a, is a Wolf-Rayet star located in the constellation Scorpius, close to the galactic plane. Its distance is around 2,020 parsecs (6,500 lightyears) away from the Earth.

HD 152408 lies in the north of the open cluster NGC 6231, the center of the OB association Scorpius OB1; it is not clear whether it is a part of the association or not. With an apparent magnitude of about 5.77, it is the third brightest Wolf-Rayet star. The other Wolf-Rayet stars that can be seen with the naked eye (although it can only be seen with the naked eye under excellent viewing conditions) are γ2 Velorum (WR 11), θ Muscae (WR 48), WR 22, WR 24 and HD 151932 (WR 78).

HD 152408 is about 24 times as massive as the Sun. Like most extremely massive stars, it is losing mass via its stellar wind. The total rate of mass loss is /yr.

References 

Scorpius (constellation)
Wolf–Rayet stars
082775
6272
152408
Durchmusterung objects